The 2018 Major League Rugby season was the inaugural season of Major League Rugby, an annual rugby union competition sanctioned by USA Rugby.
The seven inaugural teams were based in the United States. The competition began the weekend of April 21–22 with three matches, with New Orleans defeating Houston 35–26 to open the season.

Glendale and Seattle were the best two teams at the end of the regular season and won their respective semi-final matches to advance to the championship game at Torero Stadium in San Diego. Seattle became Major League Rugby's first champion team with a surprise come-from-behind 23–19 win in the final over Glendale, who had only lost once previously during the season.

Teams

Regular season

All seven participating teams played eight matches and received two rounds of byes during the regular season held over ten weeks from April through to June. The schedule was short of a full home and away draw by four match rounds, so each side played two of the other teams twice and four of them only once. The top four teams at the end of the regular season advanced to the MLR playoffs.

Standings 
The final standings for the 2018 Major League Rugby regular season were:

Matches 
The following matches were played for the 2018 Major League Rugby regular season:

Updated to match(es) played on June 23, 2018. 
Colors: Blue: home team win; Yellow: draw; Red: away team win.

Week 1

Week 2

Week 3

Week 4

Week 5

Week 6

Week 7

Week 8

Week 9

Week 10

Playoffs
The top four teams from the regular season qualified for the playoffs. The format was two semifinal matches – first versus fourth, and second versus third – followed by a Championship game between the semifinal winners to determine the MLR champion team.

The semifinals were played as a double header at Infinity Park in Glendale on June 30, followed a week later by the final at Torero Stadium in San Diego on July 7.

Semifinals

Final

Team statistics

Points by week

Tries by week

{| class="wikitable"  style="width:20%; text-align:center; line-height:90%; font-size:90%;"
|-
| style="background:#ccc;| Attack || Defense
|}

Player statistics
The leading scorers in 2018 over the regular season and playoffs combined were:

Leading try scorers

Sources:Americas Rugby News and MLR (archived).

Leading point scorers

Sources: Americas Rugby News and MLR (archived).

Sanctions

Awards
MVP of the Championship Match

All-MLR First Team

All-MLR Second Team

Notes

References

Major League Rugby seasons
Major League Rugby
Major League Rugby